Kayt Burgess is a Canadian writer, who won the Three-Day Novel Contest in 2011 for her debut novel Heidegger Stairwell. Published by Arsenal Pulp Press in 2012, the novel was subsequently a shortlisted nominee for the 2013 ReLit Award in the fiction category. She was also a finalist in the 2012 Three-Day Novel Contest, but did not win, for the not-yet-published novel Fauvel.

Heidegger Stairwell, about a successful Canadian indie rock band on the verge of collapse due to internal tensions, is narrated by a former girlfriend of the band's lead guitarist who has recently come out as a trans man, and was noted for its unconventional narrative technique, including "editorial notes" from various characters disputing and contradicting the version of the story presented by the narrator. The novel was subsequently adapted by music journalist Chandler Levack for the short film We Forgot to Break Up in 2017; a full-length feature film adaptation to be directed by Karen Knox entered production in November 2022 for likely release in 2023.

Burgess has also published short stories in the literary journals The Pinch and Mosaic, and published a standalone short story, "The Soprano", with Found Press in 2013.

Born in Manitouwadge, Ontario and raised in Elliot Lake, Burgess was educated at Humber College, the University of Western Ontario and Bath Spa University. She currently lives in Aurora, Ontario.

Works
Heidegger Stairwell (2012)
The Soprano (2013)
Connection at Newcombe (2021)

References

External links

Canadian women novelists
21st-century Canadian novelists
People from Thunder Bay District
Writers from Ontario
Living people
University of Western Ontario alumni
Humber College alumni
Alumni of Bath Spa University
Canadian women short story writers
21st-century Canadian women writers
21st-century Canadian short story writers
Year of birth missing (living people)